Byomkesh Bakshi is an Indian Bengali-language crime drama film on the fictional detective Byomkesh Bakshi. It is directed by Anjan Dutt and produced by Kaustuv Ray. The film was released on 13 August 2010 and spawned five sequels till date, including Abar Byomkesh (2012), Byomkesh Phire Elo (2012), Byomkesh Bakshi (2015), Byomkesh O Chiriyakhana (2016) and Byomkesh O Agnibaan (2017).

Plot
Byomkesh Bakshi is a Bengali detective (though he likes to be addressed as Satyanweshi, eng. truthseeker) who takes on another spine-chilling case with Ajit Kumar Banerjee, his friend who is a novelist.

The story Adim Ripu starts off with local goon Bantul Sardar offering firearms left behind by departed American WW-II soldiers to Byomkesh and Ajit in their Harrison Road, Kolkata residence. Sardar's departure is quickly followed by the arrival of Miss Nanibala Roy. Ms. Roy has an adopted son Prabhat Roy, who is also the foster-son of rich businessman Anadi Halder. Halder being single lets Ms. Nanibala Roy manages his household.

Halder has two nephews Nimai and Nitai who obviously have ill feelings towards Prabhat in the context of inheritance of Halder's riches. Additionally, Halder had recently blocked Prabhat from marrying a girl he likes, and it is suspected Nimai and Nitai have something to do with this.

Ms. Nanibala Roy is apprehensive about her adopted son's safety.

Anadi Halder is murdered, and the story takes a fascinating turn with an extremely surprising ending.

Cast
Abir Chatterjee as Byomkesh Bakshi
Saswata Chatterjee as Ajit
Ushasie Chakraborty as Satyabati
Kalyan Chatterjee as Keshto Das
Swagata Banerjee as Miss Nanibala Roy
Rudranil Ghosh as Prabhat 
Chandan Sen as Bantul
Pijush Ganguly as Gadananda
Biswajit Chakraborty as Anadi Haldar
Swastika Mukherjee as Shiuli Majumdar

Sequels

Abar Byomkesh (2012)
A sequel of this film Abar Byomkesh has released on 23 March 2012.

Byomkesh Phire Elo (2014)
Dutt made another sequel named Byomkesh Phire Elo released on 19 December 2014.

Byomkesh Bakshi (2015)
The third sequel starring Jisshu Sengupta as Bakshi instead is slated to be released in October.

See also
Byomkesh Bakshi
Sharadindu Bandyopadhyay
Abar Byomkesh
Satyanweshi
Detective Byomkesh Bakshi

References

External links 

 

2010 films
Bengali-language Indian films
Indian detective films
2010 crime drama films
Films directed by Anjan Dutt
Byomkesh Bakshi films
Films set in the British Raj
2010s Bengali-language films
Indian crime drama films
Films based on works by Saradindu Bandopadhyay